Bradley Sanders Greenberg (1934 – 26 July 2018) was an American communications theorist.

Greenberg studied journalism at Bowling Green State University, then earned a master's degree in the subject from the University of Wisconsin. He remained at UW to complete doctorate in mass communications, after which Greenberg became a research associate at the Institute for Communication Research of Stanford University. Greenberg joined the Michigan State University faculty in 1964. He was appointed a MSU Distinguished Professor in 1990. Greenberg, a fellow of the International Communication Association since 1983, served as its president from 1994 to 1995. He retired from Michigan State in 2004. Greenberg was a co-founding editor of the journal Media and Communication, first published in 2013.

Greenberg lived in Okemos, Michigan, and died at the age of 83 on 26 July 2018, of cancer.

References

1934 births
2018 deaths
Communication theorists
Michigan State University faculty
Academic journal editors
Deaths from cancer in Michigan
People from Okemos, Michigan
University of Wisconsin–Madison School of Journalism & Mass Communication alumni
Bowling Green State University alumni